The Topolog is a river in Dobruja, Romania, a right tributary of the Danube. It rises near the commune of Topolog, in the Casimcea Plateau of Tulcea County forming the Topolog Depression, which divides the Plateau in two parts: the Casimcea Plateau proper (to the east) and the Hârșova Plateau (to the west). Initially, it flows from northwest toward southeast, but eventually, it changes to east-west, spilling into Lake Hazarlâc, which is connected with the Danube.

References

Rivers of Romania
Rivers of Tulcea County
Rivers of Constanța County